Petar Arsić (born 6 November 1973) is a Serbian former professional basketball player.

International career 
Arsić was a member of the SFR Yugoslavia national cadet team that won the silver medal at the 1989 European Championship for Cadets in Spain. Over two tournament games, he averaged 10.0 points per game.

References

External links

WVU Stats

1973 births
Living people
Apollon Limassol BC players
Baltimore Bayrunners players
BC Azovmash players
BC Kyiv players
Bnei Hertzeliya basketball players
Delaware Fightin' Blue Hens men's basketball players
Israeli Basketball Premier League players
KK Budućnost players
KK Olimpija players
Kolossos Rodou B.C. players
Maccabi Haifa B.C. players
Maccabi Rishon LeZion basketball players
Power forwards (basketball)
BKK Radnički players
Serbian expatriate basketball people in Belgium
Serbian expatriate basketball people in Cyprus
Serbian expatriate basketball people in France
Serbian expatriate basketball people in Greece
Serbian expatriate basketball people in Israel
Serbian expatriate basketball people in Iran
Serbian expatriate basketball people in Montenegro
Serbian expatriate basketball people in Slovenia
Serbian expatriate basketball people in Turkey
Serbian expatriate basketball people in Ukraine
Serbian expatriate basketball people in the United States
Serbian men's basketball players
SLUC Nancy Basket players
Spirou Charleroi players
SIG Basket players
West Virginia Mountaineers men's basketball players